Thomas Somerset, 1st Viscount Somerset (1579–1651) was an English politician who sat in the House of Commons  between 1601 and 1611. He was raised to the Peerage of Ireland in 1626.

Somerset was the third son of Edward Somerset, 4th Earl of Worcester.

In 1601, Somerset was elected Member of Parliament for Monmouthshire. He became a member of Gray's Inn on 7 August 1604.  In 1604, he was re-elected MP for Monmouthshire and sat until 1611.

Somerset was sent to Scotland with Charles Percy by the Privy Council to notify James VI and I of the death of Elizabeth I. He was appointed Master of Horse to Anne of Denmark in 1603. His father was Master of Horse to King James. Somerset argued with a Scottish courtier William Murray of Abercairny about this role at York in June 1603.

On 1 January 1604, he danced at Hampton Court in The Masque of Indian and China Knights. Stewart was confined to his chamber but Somerset was sent to the Fleet Prison. Their argument followed on an incident when Somerset accompanied the Duke of Holstein and the Master of Orkney to the Queen's apartments, and as the gentlemen were at the door of her Privy Chamber, accused each other of pushing and shoving.

He was knighted as Knight of Bath on 5 January 1605. He took part in the tournament for Prince Henry, Prince Henry's Barriers in January 1610.

In December 1626, he was raised to the Peerage of Ireland as Viscount Somerset of Cashel.
 
Somerset died in 1651 and the title became extinct.

Somerset married Eleanor (or Helena) de Barry, daughter of David de Barry, 5th Viscount Buttevant, in 1616. She was the widow of Thomas Butler, 10th Earl of Ormond, who died in November 1614.

References

English barristers
Thomas
Viscounts in the Peerage of Ireland
Peers of Ireland created by Charles I
1579 births
1651 deaths
English MPs 1601
English MPs 1604–1611
16th-century English nobility
16th-century English lawyers
Household of Anne of Denmark
Younger sons of earls